McConnel is a surname. Notable people with the surname include:

Douglas McConnel (1893–1961), British Army officer
John McConnel (1806–1899), Australian pastoralist and politician
Mary McConnel (pioneer) (1824–1910), Scottish settler and hospital administrator
May Jordan McConnel (1860–1929), Australian trade unionist and suffragist
Michael McConnell (born 1942), one half of the first same-sex couple to be married legally with a license that was never revoked
Ursula McConnel (1888–1957), Australian anthropologist and ethnographer
William McConnel (1809–1902), English industrialist

See also
McConnell (surname)